Touda Bouanani (born 1966, Rabat), is a Moroccan visual artist and videographer. In 2003, she won a first prize at the Festival de Mohammedia de vidéo professionnelle.

Life 
Remembrance and memory are at the center of his work. When she was a student at the Fine Arts School of Bordeaux, she often talked about the work of her father Ahmed Bouanani. She presented Le Mirage, her father's only feature film, on VHS in its original version. She dubbed all the voices live in French, reading the translation made by her father on paper.

In 1993, she mixed her own texts with those of Georges Pérec, Jorge Luis Borges, Fernando Pessoa, or Ahmed Bouanani, in videos.

From 2011, she was the guardian of the family archives and unpublished texts. She produced a slide show where she presents her own work and the work of conservation, archiving and dissemination of the family heritage. From the archives, she produced Fragments de mémoires in 2014.

In 2016, she participated in the Arts in Marrakech (AiM) International Biennale.

In 2020, Touda Bouanani, with Maya Ouabadi and Léa Morin launched Woman, Arab and … Filmmaker. This is a research project for a feminist and decolonialist rewriting of the history of cinema. The project focuses on studying texts, writings, works of radical women filmmakers of the 1960s and 1970s, in North Africa.

Filmography 

 Conte de la énième nuit, 1993
 Une histoire de pureté, 1993

 Fiction, 5min, 1997
 Poème d’amour à Naïma, 2012
 Fragments de mémoires, 20 minutes, 2014
 Une Odyssée, in collaboration with Malik Nejmi, 2015

References 

1966 births
Moroccan film directors
Moroccan women film directors
Living people